In production, a final product, or finished product is a product that is ready for sale.

For example, oil is the final product of an oil company. The farmer sells his vegetables as his final product, after they have been through the whole process of growth.

References

See also 

By-product
Intermediate good
Raw material

Manufacturing
Product